The Technological and Higher Education Institute of Hong Kong (THEi, pronounced as “The I”) is the member institution of the Vocational Training Council (VTC) which provides vocationally-oriented bachelor's degree programmes for HKDSE candidates. Programmes offered by the Faculties of Design, Management and Hospitality, and Science and Technology feature a fine balance of theory, practice and general education with a focus on real-life projects and industrial attachments to develop competent professionals for the industry.

Faculty of Design and Environment (FDE)

Department of Design
Bachelor Program
 Bachelor of Arts (Honours) in Advertising
 Bachelor of Arts (Honours) in Fashion Design
 Bachelor of Arts (Honours) in Product Design

Department of Environment
Bachelor Program
 Bachelor of Arts (Honours) in Horticulture and Landscape Management
 Bachelor of Arts (Honours) in Landscape Architecture
 Bachelor of Landscape Architecture (Honours)
 Bachelor of Science (Honours) in Surveying
Diploma Program
 Professional Certificate in Turfgrass Science and Management
 Professional Diploma in Horticulture and Landscape Management

Innovative and Information Technology Programmes
Bachelor Program
 Bachelor of Science (Honours) in Information and Communications Technology
 Bachelor of Science (Honours) in Multimedia Technology and Innovation

Faculty of Management and Hospitality (FMH)

Department of Business Management
Bachelor Program
 Bachelor of Arts (Honours) in Professional Accounting
 Bachelor of Arts (Honours) in Public Relations and Management

Department of Hospitality Management
Bachelor Program
 Bachelor of Arts (Honours) in Culinary Arts and Management
 Bachelor of Arts (Honours) in Hotel Operations Management

Department of Sports and Recreation
Bachelor Program
 Bachelor of Social Sciences (Honours) in Sports and Recreation Management

Faculty of Science and Technology (FST)

Department of Construction Technology and Engineering
Bachelor Program
 Bachelor of Engineering (Honours) in Aircraft Engineering
 Bachelor of Engineering (Honours) in Building Services Engineering
 Bachelor of Engineering (Honours) in Civil Engineering
 Bachelor of Engineering (Honours) in Environmental Engineering and Management

Diploma Program
 Professional Diploma in Building Information Modelling
 Professional Diploma in Building Services Engineering 
 Professional Diploma in Plumbing Engineering for Building Services

Department of Food and Health Sciences
Bachelor Program
 Bachelor of Science (Honours) in Chinese Medicinal Pharmacy 
 Bachelor of Science (Honours) in Food Science and Safety
 Bachelor of Science (Honours) in Healthcare
 Bachelor of Science (Honours) in Nutrition and Healthcare Management
 Bachelor of Science (Honours) in Testing and Certification

Diploma Program
 Professional Diploma in Elderly Services

School of General Education and Languages (SGEL) programs 
Chinese
English
The Human Spirit
Habits of Scientific Thinking 
Social Dynamics of Organisations
Other Selected Electives

Campuses 
Chai Wan Main Campus: 133 Shing Tai Road, Chai Wan, Hong Kong Island
Tsing Yi Campus: 20A Tsing Yi Road, Tsing Yi, New Territories

Notable People
Lee Wai Lok (Smilingboris) - Famous Youtuber in Hong Kong

See also 
 Education in Hong Kong
 Higher education in Hong Kong

References 

 www.vtc.edu.hk/html/tc/institutions/thei.html

External links 

 Technological and Higher Education Institute of Hong Kong (THEi)
 Vocational Training Council(VTC)
 Hong Kong Design Institutes (HKDI) 

Universities and colleges in Hong Kong
Educational organisations based in Hong Kong
Educational institutions established in 1999
1999 establishments in Hong Kong